The non-marine molluscs of the Canary Islands are a part of the molluscan fauna of the Canary Islands.

A number of species of non-marine molluscs are found in the wild in Canary Islands.

Freshwater gastropods 

Hydrobiidae
 Pseudamnicola canariensis Glöer & Reuselaars, 2020 - endemic to Gran Canaria

Thiaridae
 Melanoides tuberculatus (O. F. Müller, 1774)

Lymnaeidae
 Galba truncatula (O. F. Müller, 1774) - probably non-indigenous
 Pseudosuccinea columella (Say, 1817)

Physidae
 Physella acuta (Draparnaud, 1805) - probably non-indigenous

Planorbidae
 Ancylus striatus Quoy & Gaimard, 1833 - endemic to the Canary Islands
 Gyraulus clymene (Shuttleworth, 1852) - endemic to La Palma and Tenerife
 Planorbella duryi (Wetherby, 1879) - non-indigenous
 Planorbis moquini Requien, 1848

Land gastropods 
Hydrocenidae
Hydrocena gutta Shuttleworth, 1852

Craspedopomatidae
Craspedopoma costatum (Shuttleworth, 1852) - endemic to the Canary Islands

Pomatiidae
Pomatias canariensis (d´Orbigny, 1840) - endemic to the Canary Islands
Pomatias laevigatus (Webb & Berthelot, 1833) - endemic to Tenerife
Pomatias lanzarotensis (Wollaston, 1878) - endemic to Lanzarote
Pomatias palmensis (Wollaston, 1878) - endemic to La Palma
Pomatias raricosta (Wollaston, 1878) - endemic to Tenerife

Cochlicopidae
 Cochlicopa lubricella (Rossmässler, 1834)

Chondrinidae
 Granopupa granum (Draparnaud, 1801) - probably non-indigenous

Lauriidae
 Lauria cylindracea (Da Costa, 1778)
 Lauria fanalensis (R. T. Lowe, 1852)
 Lauria gomerensis D.T. Holyoak & G.A. Holyoak, 2009
 Leiostyla castanea (Shuttleworth, 1852) - endemic to Tenerife
 Leiostyla taeniata (Shuttleworth, 1852) - endemic to the Canary Islands

Pupillidae
 Pupoides orzolae Gittenberger & Ripken, 1985 - endemic to Lanzarote

Truncatellinidae
 Columella microspora (R. T. Lowe, 1852)
 Truncatellina atomus (Shuttleworth, 1852) - endemic to the Canary Islands
 Truncatellina purpuraria Hutterer & Groh, 1993 - endemic to Fuerteventura & Lanzarote

Valloniidae
 Acanthinula spinifera (Mousson, 1872) - endemic to La Palma and Gran Canaria
 Plagyrona placida (Shuttleworth, 1852)
 Vallonia costata (O. F. Müller, 1774) - probably non-indigenous
 Vallonia pulchella (O. F Müller, 1774) - probably non-indigenous

Enidae
 Napaeus alucensis Santana & Yanes, 2011 - endemic to La Gomera
 Napaeus anaga (Grasset, 1857) - endemic to Tenerife
 Napaeus arinagaensis Artiles, Deniz & Martín, 2011 - endemic to Gran Canaria
 Napaeus avaloensis Groh, 2006 - endemic to La Gomera
 Napaeus badiosus (Webb & Berthelot, 1833) - endemic to Tenerife
 Napaeus baeticatus (Webb & Berthelot, 1833) - endemic to Tenerife
 Napaeus bajamarensis Ibáñez & Alonso, 2009 - endemic to Tenerife
 Napaeus barquini Alonso & Ibáñez, 2006 - endemic to La Gomera
 Napaeus bechi Alonso & Ibáñez, 1993 - endemic to Tenerife
 Napaeus beguirae Henríquez, 1995 - endemic to La Gomera
 Napaeus bertheloti (Pfeiffer, 1846) - endemic to La Gomera
 Napaeus boucheti Alonso & Ibáñez, 1993 - endemic to La Palma
 Napaeus chrysaloides (Wollaston, 1878) - endemic to Gran Canaria
 Napaeus consecoanus (Mousson, 1872) - endemic to La Gomera
 Napaeus delicatus Alonso, Yanes & Ibáñez, 2011 - endemic to La Palma
 Napaeus doliolum Henríquez, 1993 - endemic to Tenerife
 Napaeus elegans Alonso & Ibáñez , 1995 - endemic to Tenerife
 Napaeus encaustus (Shuttleworth, 1852) - endemic to La Palma
 Napaeus esbeltus Ibáñez & Alonso, 1995 - endemic to Tenerife
 Napaeus exilis Henríquez, 1995 - endemic to Gran Canaria
 Napaeus flavoterminatus (Wollaston, 1878) - endemic to Tenerife
 Napaeus gomerensis G. A. Holyoak & D. T. Holyoak, 2011 - endemic to La Gomera
 Napaeus grohi Alonso, Ibáñez & Santana, 2011 - endemic to El Hierro
 Napaeus gruereanus (Grasset, 1857) - endemic to El Hierro
 Napaeus halmyris (J. Mabille, 1883) - endemic to Tenerife
 Napaeus helvolus (Webb & Berthelot, 1833) - endemic to Tenerife
 Napaeus huttereri Henríquez, 1991 - endemic to Lanzarote
 Napaeus indifferens (Mousson, 1872) - endemic to Gran Canaria
 Napaeus inflatiusculus (Wollaston, 1878) - endemic to La Gomera
 Napaeus interpunctatus (Wollaston, 1878) - endemic to Gran Canaria
 Napaeus isletae Groh & Ibáñez, 1992 - endemic to Gran Canaria
 Napaeus josei Santana, Alonso & Ibáñez, 2011 - endemic to Gran Canaria
 Napaeus lajaensis Castillo, Yanes, Alonso & Ibáñez, 2006 - endemic to Tenerife
 Napaeus lichenicola Ibáñez & Alonso, 2007 - endemic to Fuerteventura
 Napaeus lowei (Wollaston, 1878) - endemic to Tenerife
 Napaeus maculatus Goodacre, 2006 - endemic to La Gomera
 Napaeus maffioteanus (Mousson, 1872) - endemic to Gran Canaria
 Napaeus minimus D.T. Holyoak & G.A. Holyoak, 2011 - endemic to La Gomera
 Napaeus moroi Martín, Alonso & Ibáñez, 2011 - endemic to La Gomera
 Napaeus moquinianus (Webb & Berthelot, 1833) - endemic to Gran Canaria
 Napaeus myosotis (Webb & Berthelot, 1833) - endemic to Gran Canaria
 Napaeus nanodes (Shuttleworth, 1852) - endemic to Tenerife
 Napaeus obesatus (Webb & Berthelot, 1833) - endemic to Gran Canaria
 Napaeus ocellatus (Mousson, 1872) - endemic to El Hierro
 Napaeus orientalis Henríquez, 1995 - endemic to La Gomera
 Napaeus ornamentatus Moro, 2009 - endemic to La Gomera
 Napaeus osoriensis (Wollaston, 1878) - endemic to Gran Canaria
 Napaeus palmaensis (Mousson, 1872) - endemic to La Palma
 Napaeus procerus Emerson, 2006 - endemic to La Gomera
 Napaeus propinquus (Shuttleworth, 1852) - endemic to Tenerife
 Napaeus pygmaeus Ibáñez & Alonso, 1993 - endemic to La Gomera
 Napaeus roccellicola (Webb & Berthelot, 1833) - endemic to Tenerife
 Napaeus rufobrunneus (Wollaston, 1878) - endemic to Lanzarote
 Napaeus rupicola (Mousson, 1872) - endemic to La Gomera
 Napaeus savinosa (Wollaston, 1878) - endemic to El Hierro
 Napaeus servus (Mousson, 1872) - endemic to La Gomera
 Napaeus severus (J. Mabille, 1898) - endemic to La Gomera
 Napaeus subgracilior (Wollaston, 1878) - endemic to La Palma
 Napaeus subsimplex (Wollaston, 1878) - endemic to El Hierro
 Napaeus tabidus (Shuttleworth, 1852) - endemic to Tenerife
 Napaeus tafadaensis Yanes, 2009 - endemic to Tenerife
 Napaeus tagamichensis Henríquez, 1993 - endemic to La Gomera
 Napaeus taguluchensis Henríquez, 1993 - endemic to La Gomera
 Napaeus tenoensis Henríquez, 1993 - endemic to Tenerife
 Napaeus teobaldoi Martín, 2009 - endemic to Tenerife
 Napaeus texturatus (Mousson, 1872) - endemic to La Gomera
 Napaeus torilensis Artiles & Deniz, 2011 - endemic to La Gomera
 Napaeus validoi Santana, Alonso & Ibáñez, 2011 - endemic to Gran Canaria
 Napaeus variatus (Webb & Berthelot, 1833) - endemic to Tenerife
 Napaeus venegueraensis Artiles, Santana & Deniz, 2011 - endemic to Gran Canaria
 Napaeus voggenreiteri Hutterer, 2006 - endemic to La Gomera

Achatinidae
 Rumina decollata (Linnaeus, 1758)

Ferussaciidae
 Cecilioides acicula (O. F. Müller, 1774) - probably non-indigenous
 Ferussacia attenuata (Mousson, 1872) - endemic to Lanzarote
 Ferussacia folliculus (Gmelin, 1791) - probably non-indigenous
 Ferussacia fritschi (Mousson, 1872) - endemic to Lanzarote
 Ferussacia lanzarotensis (Mousson, 1872) - endemic to Lanzarote
 Ferussacia submajor (Wollaston, 1878) - endemic to Fuerteventura
 Ferussacia tumidula (Wollaston, 1878) - endemic to Lanzarote
 Ferussacia valida (Mousson, 1872) - endemic to Fuerteventura
 Ferussacia vitrea (Webb & Berthelot, 1833) - endemic to Fuerteventura and Lanzarote
 Sculptiferussacia clausiliaeformis Alonso & Ibáñez, 1992 - endemic to Fuerteventura

Streptaxidae
 Gibbulinella dealbata (Webb & Berthelot, 1833) - endemic to the Canary Islands
 Gibbulinella dewinteri Bank, Groh & Ripken, 2002 - endemic to the Canary Islands
 Gibbulinella macrogira (Mousson, 1872) - endemic to La Gomera

Testacellidae
 Testacella maugei A. Férussac, 1819 - probably non-indigenous on Tenerife and Gran Canaria
 Testacella scutulum G. B. Sowerby, 1821 - probably non-indigenous on Gran Canaria

Discidae
 Canaridiscus anagaensis (Ibáñez & D. T. Holyoak, 2011) - endemic to Tenerife
 Canaridiscus engonatus (Shuttleworth, 1852) - globally extinct, was endemic to Tenerife
 Canaridiscus ganodus (J. Mabille, 1882) - endemic to La Gomera
 Canaridiscus gomerensis (Rähle, 1994) - endemic to La Gomera
 Canaridiscus kompsus (J. Mabille, 1883) - endemic to El Hierro
 Canaridiscus laurisilvae (Allgaier & M. Klemm, 2012)
 Canaridiscus putrescens (R. T. Lowe, 1861) - endemic to La Palma
 Canaridiscus retextus (Shuttleworth, 1852) - globally extinct, was endemic to La Palma
 Canaridiscus rupivagus (Rähle & Allgaier, 2011)
 Canaridiscus saproxylophagus (M. R. Alonso, G. A. Holyoak & Yanes, 2011) - endemic to La Gomera
 Canaridiscus scutulus (Shuttleworth, 1852) - endemic to Tenerife
 Canaridiscus textilis (Shuttleworth, 1852) - globally extinct, was endemic to La Palma

Punctidae
 Paralaoma servilis (Shuttleworth, 1852)
 Punctum pygmaeum (Draparnaud, 1801)

Gastrodontidae
 Janulus pompylius (Shuttleworth, 1852) - globally extinct, was endemic to La Palma
 Janulus traviesus Castro, Yanes, García, Alonso & Ibáñez, 2014 - endemic to La Palma
 Vermetum festinans (Shuttleworth, 1852) - endemic to La Palma
 Vermetum tamadabaensis D.T. Holyoak, G.A. Holyoak, Yanes, Santana, García, Castro, Artiles, Alonso & Ibáñez, 2014 - endemic to Gran Canaria
 Zonitoides arboreus (Say, 1817) - non-indigenous on Tenerife

Oxychilidae
 Mediterranea hydatina (Rossmässler, 1838) - probably non-indigenous on Tenerife
 Oxychilus alliarius (Miller, 1822) - non-indigenous on Tenerife since 2009
 Oxychilus cellarius (O. F. Müller, 1774) - probably non-indigenous
 Oxychilus draparnaudi (Beck, 1837) - probably non-indigenous
 Retinella circumsessa (Shuttleworth, 1852) - endemic to Tenerife
 Retinella hierroensis Alonso & Ibáñez, 2013 - endemic to El Hierro
 Retinella lenis (Shuttleworth, 1852) - endemic to La Palma
 Retinella osoriensis (Wollaston, 1878) - endemic to Gran Canaria
 Retinella rochebruni (J. Mabille, 1882) - endemic to La Gomera

Pristilomatidae
 Hawaiia minuscula (Binney, 1841) - non-indigenous on Tenerife
 Vitrea contracta (Westerlund, 1871)

Milacidae
 Milax gagates (Draparnaud, 1801) - probably non-indigenous
 Milax nigricans - non-indigenous on Tenerife since 2009

Parmacellidae

 Cryptella alegranzae Hutterer & Groh, 1991 - endemic to Lanzarote
 Cryptella auriculata (Mousson, 1872) - endemic to Fuerteventura
 Cryptella canariensis Webb & Berthelot, 1833 - endemic to Fuerteventura and Lanzarote
 Cryptella famarae Hutterer & Groh, 1991 - endemic to Lanzarote
 Cryptella parvula (Hutterer, 1990) - endemic to Fuerteventura and Lanzarote
 Cryptella susannae (Hutterer, 1990) - endemic to Fuerteventura
 Cryptella tamaranensis (Hutterer, 1990) - endemic to Gran Canaria
 Parmacella tenerifensis Alonso, Ibáñez & Díaz, 1985 - endemic to Tenerife, vulnerable or endangered

Agriolimacidae
 Deroceras laeve (O. F. Müller, 1774) - probably non-indigenous
 Deroceras invadens Reise, Hutchinson, Schunack & Schlitt, 2011 - probably non-indigenous
 Deroceras reticulatum (O. F. Müller, 1774) - probably non-indigenous

Boettgerillidae
 Boettgerilla pallens Simroth, 1912

Limacidae
 Lehmannia nyctelia (Bourguignat, 1861) - probably non-indigenous on Tenerife
 Lehmannia valentiana (A. Férussac, 1822) - probably non-indigenous
 Limacus flavus (Linnaeus, 1758) - probably non-indigenous
 Malacolimax wiktori Alonso & Ibáñez, 1989 - endemic to Tenerife

Vitrinidae
 Canarivitrina dianae (Valido & M. R. Alonso, 2000) - endemic to La Gomera
 Canarivitrina falcifera (Ibáñez & Groh, 2000) - endemic to La Gomera
 Canarivitrina mascaensis (Morales, 1987) - endemic to Tenerife
 Canarivitrina ripkeni (M. R. Alonso & Ibáñez, 2000) - endemic to La Gomera
 Canarivitrina taburientensis (Groh & Valido, 2000) - endemic to La Palma
 Guerrina christinae Groh, 1993 - endemic to La Gomera
 Guerrina cuticula (Shuttleworth, 1852) - endemic to La Palma and Tenerife
 Insulivitrina blauneri (Shuttleworth, 1852) - endemic to Tenerife
 Insulivitrina canariensis (Mousson, 1872) - endemic to El Hierro
 Insulivitrina eceroensis M. R. Alonso & Ibáñez, 1987 - endemic to El Hierro
 Insulivitrina emmersoni Morales, 1988 - endemic to La Gomera
 Insulivitrina gomerensis M. R. Alonso & Ibáñez, 1988 - endemic to La Gomera
 Insulivitrina lamarckii (A. Férussac, 1821) - endemic to Tenerife
 Insulivitrina machadoi Ibáñez & M. R. Alonso, 1990 - endemic to Gran Canaria
 Insulivitrina nogalesi M. R. Alonso & Ibáñez, 1990 - endemic to Gran Canaria
 Insulivitrina oromii Ibáñez & M. R. Alonso, 1988 - endemic to La Gomera
 Insulivitrina parryi (Gude, 1896) - endemic to Gran Canaria
 Insulivitrina raquelae Valido, Yanes, M. R. Alonso & Ibáñez, 2014
 Insulivitrina reticulata (Mousson, 1872) - endemic to Tenerife
 Insulivitrina solemi (Ibáñez & M. R. Alonso, 2001) - endemic to La Palma
 Insulivitrina tamaranensis Valido, 1990 - endemic to Gran Canaria
 Insulivitrina tuberculata Ibáñez & M. R. Alonso, 1987 - endemic to Tenerife

Arionidae
 Arion hortensis Férussac, 1819 - probably non-indigenous on Lanzarote

Canariellidae
 Canariella bimbachensis Ibáñez & Alonso, 2002 - endemic to El Hierro
 Canariella discobolus (Shuttleworth, 1852) - endemic to La Gomera
 Canariella eutropis (Shuttleworth, 1861) - endemic to Fuerteventura
 Canariella falkneri Alonso, Ibáñez & Ponte- Lira, 2002 - endemic to La Gomera
 Canariella giustii Ibáñez & Alonso, 2006 - endemic to Tenerife
 Canariella gomerae (Wollaston, 1878) - endemic to La Gomera
 Canariella hispidula (Lamarck, 1822) - endemic to Tenerife
 the taxa Canariella berthelotii (d´Orbigny, 1836), C. fortunata (Shuttleworth, 1852), C. fortunata beata (Wollaston, 1878), C. lanosa (Mousson, 1872) and C. subhispidula (Mousson, 1872) were placed in the synonymy of C. hispidula
 Canariella huttereri Ponte-Lira & Groh, 1994 - endemic to El Hierro
 Canariella jandiaensis Ibáñez & Ponte-Lira, 2006 - endemic to Fuerteventura
 Canariella leprosa (Shuttleworth, 1852) - endemic to Tenerife
 Canariella multigranosa (Mousson, 1872) - endemic to La Gomera
 Canariella planaria (Lamarck, 1822) - endemic to Tenerife
 Canariella plutonia (R.T Lowe, 1861) - endemic to Fuerteventura and Lanzarote
 Canariella pontelirae Hutterer, 1994 - endemic to Tenerife, critically endangered
 Canariella pthonera (Mabille, 1883) - endemic to Tenerife
 Canariella ronceroi Ponte-Lira, 2002 - endemic to La Gomera
 Canariella squamata Alonso, Ibáñez & Ponte- Lira, 2003 - endemic to La Gomera
 Canariella tenuicostulata Alonso, Ibáñez & Ponte-Lira, 2003 - endemic to La Gomera
 Canariella tillieri Alonso, Ibáñez & Ponte-Lira, 2003 - endemic to La Palma

Geomitridae
 Cernuella virgata (Da Costa, 1778) - probably non-indigenous
 Cochlicella barbara (Linnaeus, 1758) - probably non-indigenous
 Keraea garachicoensis (Wollaston, 1878) - globally extinct, it was endemic to Tenerife
 Microxeromagna lowei (Potiez & Michaud, 1835)
 Monilearia arguineguinensis (Seddon & Aparicio, 1998) - endemic to Gran Canaria
 Monilearia caementitia (Shuttleworth, 1852) - endemic to Gran Canaria
 Monilearia granostriata (Mousson, 1857) - endemic to Fuerteventura
 Monilearia loweana (Wollaston, 1878) - endemic to Lanzarote
 Monilearia monilifera (Webb & Berthelot, 1833) - endemic to Fuerteventura and Lanzarote
 Monilearia montigena Bank, Groh & Ripken, 2002 - endemic to Gran Canaria
 Monilearia multipunctata (Mousson, 1872) - endemic to Fuerteventura
 Monilearia oleacea (Shuttleworth, 1852) - endemic to La Palma
 Monilearia persimilis (Shuttleworth, 1852) - endemic to the Canary Islands
 Monilearia phalerata (Webb & Berthelot, 1833) - endemic to Tenerife
 Monilearia praeposita (Mousson, 1872) - endemic to Gran Canaria
 Monilearia pulverulenta (R. T. Lowe, 1861) - endemic to Gran Canaria
 Monilearia tubaeformis M. R. Alonso & Groh, 2006 - endemic to Fuerteventura
 Monilearia tumulorum (Webb & Berthelot, 1833) - endemic to Gran Canaria
 Monilearia watsoniana (Wollaston, 1878) - endemic to Gran Canaria
 Monilearia woodwardia (Mousson, 1872) - endemic to Tenerife
 Obelus despreauxii (d´Orbigny, 1839) - endemic to Gran Canaria
 Obelus discogranulatus  Alonso & Groh, 2003 - endemic to Fuerteventura
 Obelus mirandae (Lowe, 1861) - endemic to La Gomera
 Obelus moderatus (Mousson, 1857) - endemic to Fuerteventura
 Obelus moratus (Mousson, 1872) - endemic to Fuerteventura
 Obelus pumilio  (Dillwyn, 1817) - endemic to Gran Canaria and Fuerteventura
 Obelus zarzaensis Neiber, Walther, Santana Benítez, Alonso & Ibáñez, 2016 - endemic to Fuerteventura
 Orexana ultima (Mousson, 1872) - endemic to Fuerteventura
 Ripkeniella petrophila (Lowe, 1861) - endemic to La Gomera
 Xerotricha adoptata (Mousson, 1872) - endemic to La Gomera
 Xerotricha apicina (Lamarck, 1822) - probably non-indigenous
 Xerotricha conspurcata (Draparnaud, 1801) - probably non-indigenous
 Xerotricha crispolanata (Wollaston, 1878) - taxonomic status uncertain
 Xerotricha lancerottensis (Webb & Berthelot, 1833) - endemic to Fuerteventura and Lanzarote
 Xerotricha nodosostriata (Mousson, 1872) - taxonomic status uncertain
 Xerotricha nubivaga (Mabille, 1882) - endemic to Tenerife
 Xerotricha orbignii (d'Orbigny, 1836) - endemic to Tenerife
 Xerotricha pavida (Mousson, 1872) - endemic to La Palma

Helicidae
 Cornu aspersum (O. F. Müller, 1774) - probably non-indigenous
 Hemicycla berkeleii (R. T. Lowe, 1861) - endemic to Gran Canaria
 Hemicycla bethencourtiana (Shuttleworth, 1852) - endemic to Tenerife
 Hemicycla bidentalis (Lamarck, 1822) - endemic to Tenerife
Hemicycla bidentalis bidentalis (Lamarck, 1822) - endemic to Tenerife
Hemicycla bidentalis inaccessibilis Groh, 1988 - endemic to Tenerife
 Hemicycla cardiobola (J. Mabille, 1882) - endemic to Tenerife
 Hemicycla consobrina (A. Férussac, 1821) - endemic to Tenerife
Hemicycla consobrina consobrina (A. Férussac, 1821) - endemic to Tenerife
Hemicycla consobrina invernicata (Mousson, 1872) - endemic to Tenerife
Hemicycla consobrina nivariae (Wollaston, 1878) - endemic to Tenerife
Hemicycla consobrina retrodens (Mousson, 1872) - endemic to Tenerife
 Hemicycla desculpta (Mousson, 1872) - endemic to Fuerteventura
 Hemicycla diegoi Neiber, Vega-Luz, Vega-Luz & Koenemann, 2011 - endemic to Tenerife
 Hemicycla digna (Mousson, 1872) - endemic to La Gomera
 Hemicycla distensa (Mousson, 1872) - endemic to La Gomera
 Hemicycla efferata (Mousson, 1872) - endemic to La Gomera
 Hemicycla ethelema (J. Mabille, 1882) - endemic to Gran Canaria
 Hemicycla eurythyra O. Boettger 1908 - endemic to Tenerife
 Hemicycla flavistoma Alonso, Henríquez & Ibáñez, 1991 - endemic to Lanzarote
 Hemicycla fritschi (Mousson, 1872) - endemic to La Gomera
 Hemicycla fulgida Alonso & Ibáñez, 2007 - endemic to Tenerife
 Hemicycla fuenterroquensis Castro, Yanes, Alonso & Ibáñez, 2012 - endemic to La Palma
 Hemicycla gaudryi (d'Orbigny, 1839)) - endemic to Gran Canaria
 Hemicycla glasiana (Shuttleworth, 1852) - endemic to Gran Canaria
 Hemicycla glyceia (J. Mabille, 1882) - endemic to Tenerife
Hemicycla glyceia glyceia (J. Mabille, 1882) - endemic to Tenerife
Hemicycla glyceia silensis Cavero, 1988 - endemic to Tenerife
 Hemicycla gomerensis (Morelet, 1864) - endemic to La Gomera
 Hemicycla granomalleata (Wollaston, 1878) - endemic to La Palma
 Hemicycla guamartemes (Grasset, 1857) - endemic to Gran Canaria
 Hemicycla hedybia (J. Mabille, 1882) - endemic to La Gomera
 Hemicycla incisogranulata (Mousson, 1872) - endemic to Tenerife
 Hemicycla inutilis (Mousson, 1872) - endemic to Tenerife
 Hemicycla laurijona Alonso & Ibanez, 2007 - endemic to La Gomera
 Hemicycla mascaensis Alonso & Ibáñez, 1988 - endemic to Tenerife
 Hemicycla maugeana (Shuttleworth, 1852) - endemic to El Hierro
 Hemicycla merita (Mousson, 1872) - endemic to La Gomera
 Hemicycla melchori Vega-Luz & Vega-Luz, 2008 - endemic to Tenerife
 Hemicycla modesta (Férussac, 1821) - endemic to Tenerife
 Hemicycla montefortiana Beck & Rähle, 2006 - endemic to La Gomera
 Hemicycla moussoniana (Wollaston, 1878) - endemic to La Gomera
 Hemicycla paeteliana (L. Pfeiffer, 1859) - endemic to Fuerteventura
 Hemicycla paivanopsis (J. Mabille, 1882) - endemic to La Gomera
 Hemicycla perraudierei (Grasset, 1857) - endemic to El Hierro
 Hemicycla perrieri (J. Mabille, 1882) - endemic to Tenerife
 Hemicycla planorbella (Lamarck, 1816) - endemic to La Gomera
 Hemicycla plicaria (Lamarck, 1816) - endemic to Tenerife
 Hemicycla pouchadan Ibáñez & Alonso, 2007 - endemic to Tenerife
 Hemicycla pouchet (A. Férussac, 1821) - endemic to Tenerife
 Hemicycla psathyra (R. T. Lowe, 1861) - endemic to Gran Canaria
Hemicycla psathyra bituminosa (J. Mabille, 1883) - endemic to Gran Canaria
Hemicycla psathyra psathyra (R. T. Lowe, 1861) - endemic to Gran Canaria
Hemicycla psathyra temperata (Mousson, 1872) - endemic to Gran Canaria
 Hemicycla quadricincta (Morelet, 1864) - endemic to La Gomera
Hemicycla quadricincta quadricincta (Morelet, 1864) - endemic to La Gomera
Hemicycla quadricincta subaucta (Wollaston, 1878) - endemic to La Gomera
 Hemicycla saponacea (R. T. Lowe, 1861) - endemic to Gran Canaria
 Hemicycla sarcostoma (Webb & Berthelot, 1833) - endemic to Fuerteventura and Lanzarote
 Hemicycla saulcyi (d´Orbigny, 1839) - endemic to Gran Canaria
Hemicycla saulcyi carta (J. Mabille, 1882) - endemic to Gran Canaria
Hemicycla saulcyi saulcyi (d´Orbigny, 1839) - endemic to Gran Canaria
 Hemicycla vermiplicata (Wollaston, 1878) - endemic to La Palma
 Otala lactea (O. F. Müller, 1774) - probably non-indigenous
 Theba arinagae Gittenberger & Ripken, 1987 - endemic to the Canary Islands
 Theba clausoinflata (Mousson, 1857) - endemic to Fuerteventura
 Theba costillae Hutterer, 1990 - endemic to Fuerteventura
 Theba geminata (Mousson, 1857) - endemic to the Canary Islands
 Theba grasseti (Mousson, 1872) - endemic to Gran Canaria
 Theba impugnata (Mousson, 1857) - endemic to Fuerteventura and Lanzarote
 Theba orzolae Gittenberger & Ripken, 1985 - endemic to Lanzarote
 Theba pisana (O. F. Müller, 1774) - probably non-indigenous

Trissexodontidae
 Caracollina lenticula (Michaud, 1831)

Freshwater bivalves
Sphaeriidae
 Pisidium casertanum (Poli, 1791)

See also
 Macaronesia ecoregion

Lists of molluscs of surrounding countries:
 List of non-marine molluscs of Madeira
 List of non-marine molluscs of Spain
 List of non-marine molluscs of Portugal
 List of non-marine molluscs of Morocco
 Wildlife of Western Sahara

References

Further reading 
 Alonso M. R. & Ibáñez M. (24 May 2007) "Anatomy and function of the penial twin papillae system of the Helicinae (Gastropoda: Helicoidea: Helicidae) and description of two new, small Hemicycla species from the laurel forest of the Canary Islands". Zootaxa 1482: 1-23. 41 plates. abstract.
 Alonso M. R., Ibáñez M., Valido M. J., Ponte-Lira C. E. & Henriquez F. C. (1991) (1988). "Catalogación de la malacofauna terrestre endémica de Canarias, con vistas a su protección. Isla de Tenerife". Iberus 8(2): 121–128.
 Diaz J. A., Alonso M. R. & Ibáñez M. (1986). "Los pulmonados desnudos de las Islas Canarias. I. Superfamilias Testacelloidea Gray 1840 y Zonitoidea Morch 1864". Vieraea 16: 81–96. La Laguna.

Molluscs
Canary Islands
Canary Islands